Christine Rollier is a French-British immunologist who is a professor at the University of Surrey. She focusses on the development of viral vector vaccines to treat infectious diseases. In particular, Rollier has focussed on the development of vaccinations to eliminate the plague.

Early life and education 
Rollier was born in France. She was an undergraduate student in biochemistry at the University of Lyon. Her doctoral research considered DNA immunisation as a therapeutic tool to treat people with Hepatitis B. She worked alongside physicians at the Inserm (Institut National de la Sante et Recherche Medicale). After earning her doctorate, Rollier moved to the Biomedical Primate Research Center in The Netherlands, where she worked for six years on the development of vaccines to treat Hepatitis C.

Research and career 
Rollier joined the Jenner Institute in 2007, where she worked as an immunologist to develop vaccines to treat malaria. Her first position at Oxford was in the laboratory of Adrian Hill. In 2010, she joined the Oxford Vaccine Group. She was interested in the design of viral vector vaccines. Rollier focussed on bacterial and infectious diseases that affect children. She has also focussed on vaccine candidates to fight typhoid and paratyphoid fever.

In the early days of the COVID-19 pandemic, Rollier shifted her focus to developing a COVID-19 vaccine. She worked on a vaccine against the plague, which made use of the ChAdOx1 vaccine vector. Outbreaks of the plague continue to occur around the world, impacting communities across rural Africa and the United States. The disease is endemic in Madagascar, with outbreaks in 2017 and 2021. ChAdOx1 is a weakened version of chimpanzee adenoviridae (the common cold virus). Specifically, Rollier and co-workers added genes to generate proteins from Yersinia pestis, the plague bacterium. These proteins are important in the plague bacterium infection pathway, and teach the body to recognise and fight against plague bacteria. Rollier has said it is challenging to develop vaccinations against the plague as they are bacterial infections, not viruses.

In 2021, Rollier moved to the University of Surrey, where she was made Professor of Vaccinology.

Selected publications

Personal life 
Rollier has two children, and took an eighteen-month career break after having her first child.

References 

British immunologists
Women immunologists
Living people
Year of birth missing (living people)